Greatest Hits is a compilation album by rapper Nas released through Columbia Records on November 6, 2007. It features twelve of Nas' singles from his Columbia releases from Illmatic to Street's Disciple and two new tracks. Nas' 2006 studio album Hip Hop Is Dead was overlooked because it was released by Def Jam and not Columbia. Nastradamus and The Lost Tapes were also left out. The collaboration made with Cee-Lo for the Rush Hour 3 soundtrack is also included on the album. Greatest Hits debuted at #124 on the Billboard 200, selling about 6,800 copies, and #20 on the Billboard Top R&B/Hip-Hop Albums. As of August 2008 the compilation has sold over 20,000 copies in the US.

The cover features lyrics from his hit single "If I Ruled the World (Imagine That)" which appears on the compilation.

Track listing

International Bonus Tracks

Samples Used
"Surviving the Times"
"What Would I Do If I Could Feel" by Nipsey Russell
"Use Me" by Bill Withers
"It Ain't Hard To Tell"
"Human Nature" by Michael Jackson
"N.T." by Kool & the Gang
"Long Red (Live)" by Mountain
"Why Can't People Be Colors Too?" by The Whatnauts
"Slow Dance" by Stanley Clarke
"What Do You Want from Me Woman" by The Blue Jays
"Sorcerer of Isis" by Power of Zeus
"Life's A Bitch"
"Yearning for Your Love" by The Gap Band
"Black Frost" by Grover Washington Jr.
"N.Y. State of Mind"
"Mind Rain" by Joe Chambers
"Flight Time" by Donald Byrd
"Mahogany" by Eric B. & Rakim
"One Love"
"Smilin' Billy Suite Pt. II" by The Heath Brothers
"Mixed Up Cup" by Clyde McPhatter
"Come in out of the Rain" by Parliament
"If I Ruled the World"
"Friends" by Whodini
"If I Ruled The World" by Kurtis Blow (interpolation)
"Walk Right Up To The Sun" by The Delfonics (interpolation)
"Street Dreams (Remix)"
"Sweet Dreams (Are Made of This)" by Eurythmics (interpolation)
"Choosey Lover" by Isley Brothers
"Hate Me Now"
"Carmina Burana" by Carl Orff
"One Mic"
"In the Air Tonight" by Phil Collins
"I'm Gonna Love You Just a Little More Baby" by Barry White
"Got Ur Self A..."
"Woke Up This Morning" by Alabama 3
"Made You Look"
"Apache" by Incredible Bongo Band
"I Can"
"Für Elise" as composed by Ludwig van Beethoven (interpolation)
"Impeach the President" by The Honeydrippers
"Bridging the Gap"
"Mannish Boy" by Muddy Waters (interpolation)
"Halftime"
"Dead End" from the Hair OST (Japanese Release)
"Soul Travelin'" by Gary Byrd
"School Boy Crush" by Average White Band
"Hawaiian Sophie" by Jaz-O
"Nas Is Like"
"Why" by Don Robertson
"Canata of New Life" by John Rydgren
"It Ain't Hard To Tell" by Nas
"Thief's Theme"
"In-A-Gadda-Da-Vida" by Iron Butterfly

Chart positions

Certifications

References

2007 greatest hits albums
Nas compilation albums
Albums produced by DJ Premier
Albums produced by L.E.S. (record producer)
Albums produced by Large Professor
Albums produced by Salaam Remi
Albums produced by Trackmasters
Columbia Records compilation albums
Hip hop compilation albums